Persim stands for Persatuan Sepakbola Indonesia Maros (en: Football Association of Indonesia Maros). Persim Maros is an  Indonesian football club based in Maros, South Sulawesi. They currently compete in the Liga 3.

Persim stadium named Kassi Kebo Stadium located in downtown Maros, South Sulawesi.

References

External links
 Persim Maros at Liga-Indonesia.co.id
 

 
Football clubs in Indonesia
Football clubs in South Sulawesi
Association football clubs established in 1950
1950 establishments in Indonesia